Richard David Hewes (August 16, 1926 – July 8, 2014) was an American politician from Cape Elizabeth, Maine. A Republican, Hewes served as Speaker of the Maine House of Representatives from 1973 to 1974. Another Republican Speaker was not elected until Robert Nutting in December 2010.

Background
Hewes was born at Webber Hospital in Biddeford, Maine, grew up in Saco and attended Thornton Academy. He served in the United States Army during World War II. Hewes received his Bachelor of Science degree from The University of Maine and his law degree from Boston University Law School. Hewes practiced law in Saco, Maine with his father and then moved to Boston, Massachusetts to practice law before returning to Maine and was a trial lawyer and senior partner in Portland.

Hewes served in the Maine House of Representatives from 1966 to 1976. From 1972–1974, Hewes served as House Speaker. In that position, Hewes was noted for building ample public parking around the State House. He left office to advocate for the Equal Rights Amendment. In 1976, Hewes was narrowly elected to the State Senate from District 8. He served only one term in the Maine Senate. In 1983, Hewes was appointed by Governor Joseph Brennan to the Cumberland County Commission, where he stayed until the 1990s.

Death
Hewes died at his home in Cape Elizabeth of Parkinson's disease on July 8, 2014. He was 87.

References

1926 births
2014 deaths
Politicians from Biddeford, Maine
People from Cape Elizabeth, Maine
People from Saco, Maine
University of Maine alumni
Boston University School of Law alumni
Maine lawyers
Massachusetts lawyers
Speakers of the Maine House of Representatives
Republican Party members of the Maine House of Representatives
Republican Party Maine state senators
County commissioners in Maine
Neurological disease deaths in Maine
Deaths from Parkinson's disease
20th-century American lawyers
Thornton Academy alumni